Lone Cone is a mountain located  north of Tofino and  northwest of Mount Colnett on the western peninsula of Meares Island in Clayoquot Land District, British Columbia, Canada. The mountain has always been a noticeable landmark to all inhabitants with its looming presence on the north end of Meares Island. The early pioneers believed that if there were clouds blocking the summit then there would be approaching good weather.

Lone Cone is composed of igneous rock of the Catface Intrusions. These are masses of quartz diorite that intruded the Westcoast Crystalline complex. At least one of them has been dated, at about 41 million years old.

References

 

Mountains of British Columbia under 1000 metres
Clayoquot Land District